Jin Zhi-Juan (born 4 October 1964) is a Taiwanese singer-songwriter, formerly known by the stage-name Wawa (娃娃 "Doll"). She achieved first success as the singer with the 4-man pop band Qiuqiu Chorus (:zh:丘丘合唱團). After leaving the band to go solo the peak of her popularity was her period with Rock Records (1990-1995) including albums such as Heavy Rain 《大雨》, and Four Seasons with songwriter Lo Ta-yu, which were also issued under license in the PRC.

Discography

References

1964 births
Living people